Jemal Zeinklishvili Stadium is a multi-use stadium in Borjomi, Samtskhe–Javakheti region, Georgia.  It is used mostly for football matches and is the home stadium of FC Borjomi. The stadium is able to hold 4,000 people.

A stadium in Borjomi also is home to an artificial turf pitch, called Xtreme Turf.  This football turf was manufactured and installed by Act Global.

References 

Sports venues in Georgia (country)
Football venues in Georgia (country)
Buildings and structures in Samtskhe–Javakheti